Davi Millsaps (born February 2, 1988) is a former American professional motorcycle racer who raced in the AMA Supercross and Outdoor Motocross championships. A multi-time supercross and motocross champion, he retired before the 2018 supercross season.

Millsaps is tied for 19th place in all-time 450 Supercross race wins and 9th place all-time for 250 Suprecross race wins. Millsaps has 13 Supercross combined wins. Millsaps was also a nine-time national Amateur champion.

Season results

2004 to 2006

2004: 9th (125 2T ESX), 8th (125 2T MX); 2005: 3rd (125 2T ESX), 8th (125 2T MX); 2006: 1st (250 4T ESX), 3rd (250 4T MX)

2006 season
In 2006, Millsaps had a breakout year as he won the 2006 AMA East SX Lites Championship.

2007 to 2011

2007: 15th (450 4T SX), 12th (450 4T MX); 2008: 4th (450 4T SX), 11th (450 4T MX); 2009: 8th (450 4T SX), 11th (450 4T MX); 2010: 3rd (450 4T SX), 19th (450 4T MX); 2011: 8th (450 4T SX), 10th (450 4T MX)

2012 season
Millsaps took 2nd place overall – 450 Supercross Championship.

2013 season
Millsaps took 2nd to Ryan Villopoto in 450 4T SX.

2014 season
Millsaps won the Monster Energy Cup.

2015 season
Millsaps took 5th place in the Monster Energy Cup.

2016 season
450 4T champion of Canadian MX Nationals.

Career AMA Supercross/Motocross results

Championships

2006 AMA East SX Lites Champion

Personal life
He is the step-brother of Bryan Johnson.

References

1988 births
Living people
Sportspeople from Orlando, Florida
American motocross riders